The 2019 LTP Charleston Pro Tennis was a professional tennis tournament played on outdoor clay courts. It was the third edition of the tournament which was part of the 2019 ITF Women's World Tennis Tour. It took place in Charleston, South Carolina, United States between 29 April and 5 May 2019.

Singles main-draw entrants

Seeds

 1 Rankings are as of 22 April 2019.

Other entrants
The following players received wildcards into the singles main draw:
  Ann Li
  Rasheeda McAdoo
  Emma Navarro
  Alycia Parks

The following player received entry using a protected ranking:
  Lucie Hradecká

The following players received entry from the qualifying draw:
  Sophie Chang
  Louisa Chirico
  Kayla Day
  Coco Gauff
  Deniz Khazaniuk
  Mari Osaka
  Gaia Sanesi
  Belinda Woolcock

The following player received entry as a lucky loser:
  Abbie Myers

Champions

Singles

 Taylor Townsend def.  Whitney Osuigwe, 6–4, 6–4

Doubles

 Asia Muhammad /  Taylor Townsend def.  Madison Brengle /  Lauren Davis, 6–2, 6–2

References

External links
 2019 LTP Charleston Pro Tennis at ITFtennis.com
 Official website

2019 ITF Women's World Tennis Tour
2019 in American tennis
LTP Charleston Pro Tennis
2019 in American women's sports